William Goodenough (bapt. 24 January 1773 – 13 December 1854) was Archdeacon of Carlisle from 1827  to his death.

Goodenough was born in Broughton, Oxfordshire to Edmund Goodenough and Anna Juliana Taunton  and educated at Christ Church, Oxford. He held incumbencies at Warkworth and Great Salkeld.

He died in 1854 in Mareham le Fen.

References

1772 births
Alumni of Christ Church, Oxford
Archdeacons of Carlisle
1854 deaths
People from Oxfordshire (before 1974)